The UNESCO World Water Assessment Programme (UNESCO WWAP) was founded in 2000 in response to a call from the UN Commission on Sustainable Development (CSD) to produce a UN system-wide periodic global overview of the status (quantity and quality), use and management of freshwater resources. To meet this challenge, WWAP coordinates the work of 31 UN-Water members and international partners, under the umbrella mechanism of UN-Water, in the production of the World Water Development Report (WWDR). The WWDR is the UN flagship report on water issues; it is a comprehensive review, released every year with a different focus on different strategic water issues, that gives an overall picture of the state, use and management of the world’s freshwater resources and aims to provide decision-makers with tools to formulate and implement sustainable water policies.

Background
The growing global water crisis threatens the security, stability and environmental sustainability of developing but also developed nations. Millions die each year from water-borne diseases, while water pollution and ecosystem destruction aggravate, particularly in the developing world. Over the past few decades there has been an increasing acceptance that the management of water resources must be undertaken with an integrated approach, that assessment of the resource is of fundamental importance as the basis for decision-making and that national capacities to undertake necessary assessments must be fully supported. Management decisions to alleviate poverty, to allow economic development, to ensure food security and the health of human populations as well as preserve vital ecosystems, must be based on our best possible understanding of all relevant systems. 

In 1998, the Sixth Session of the Commission on Sustainable Development stated that there was a need for regular, global assessments on the status of freshwater resources. In response to this  the World Water Assessment Programme was founded in 2000 to coordinate the production of the UN World Water Development Report (WWDR), and to report on the status of global freshwater resources. Initially the periodicity and coverage of the Report was triennial and comprehensive, but in 2012, UN-Water changed it to have an annual and theme oriented Report.

Mission and Objectives
This UNESCO programme aims to equip water managers and policy- and decision-makers with knowledge, tools and skills necessary to formulate and implement sustainable water policies.

The Programme's objectives are to:
• Monitor, assess and report on the world's freshwater resources and ecosystems, water use and management, and identify critical issues and problems;
• Help countries develop their own assessment capacity;
• Raise awareness on current and imminent/future water related challenges to influence the global water agenda;
• Learn and respond to the needs of decision-makers and water resource managers;
• Promote gender equality;
• Measure progress towards achieving sustainable use of water resources through robust indicators; and
• Support anticipatory decision-making on the global water system including the identification of alternative futures.

Activities
The United Nations World Water Development Report

The United Nations World Water Development Report (WWDR) is the UN-Water flagship report on water. It is a comprehensive review that gives an overall picture of the state, use and management of the world’s freshwater resources and aims to provide decision-makers with tools to formulate and implement sustainable water policies.

From 2003 till 2012, the WWDR was produced and released every three years following a comprehensive approach. As a result of a Global Stakeholder Survey in 2012, UN-Water decided to change the periodicity of the WWDR into an annual production with a thematic focus on different strategic water issues. The content produced for the WWDR serves as basis for the celebrations of World Water Day (22 March) and related discussions throughout the year.

Through a series of assessments, the Reports provide a mechanism for monitoring changes in the resource and its management and tracking progress towards achieving targets, particularly those of the 2030 Agenda for Sustainable Development. The Reports also offer best practices as well as in-depth theoretical analyses to help stimulate ideas and actions for better stewardship in the water sector.

This authoritative publication is the result of a highly concerted process among partners and members comprising UN-Water under the coordination of WWAP.

WWAP Case Studies

One of the key objectives of WWAP is to help countries improve their self-assessment capability by building on existing strengths and experiences.

WWAP fulfils this mission by assisting in the preparation of case studies in countries around the world in order to highlight the state of water resources where different physical, climatic and socio-economic conditions prevail. In this regard, case studies show the diversity of circumstances and different human needs. The second purpose of the case studies is to highlight the challenges that need to be addressed in the water resources sector. In the process, the skills and experience of both local water professionals and policy-makers are engaged and enhanced.

WWAP is both global and local in scale, for it must check the accuracy of the big picture on the basis of snapshots of water in the field. In the global strategy to improve the overall quality of water resources, local actions often present the starting point the most fruitful efforts. The WWAP case studies aim to provide a snapshot of those efforts while showing the significance of the decisions taken at local, sub-national and national levels.

The lessons learned, from both successes and failures, may be shared with other countries interested in addressing such issues.

SDG 6 – Synthesis Report

The SDG 6 Synthesis Report  aims to provide an overview of the status of SDG 6 implementation at the global and regional levels, as well as some comprehensive information about how SDG 6 is interlinked to other SDG targets and indicators of the Agenda 2030 and the overall sustainability challenges that nations around the world are faced with. By summarizing the progress towards the achievement of SDG 6, this report will provide Member States with the ‘big picture’ on water and sanitation issues, outlining ways to accelerate progress towards this goal. Lessons learned and win-win solutions by which more than one SDG is benefited from SDG 6-related actions, as well as trade-offs and the potential implication of policies adopted by countries will be highlighted. This will enable countries to develop a roadmap towards a more sustainable development, for which water is critical in many regards.
The World Water Assessment Programme coordinates a Task Force to produce the SDG 6 Synthesis Report 2018, composed by some UN-Water members, such as CEO Water Mandate, FAO, ILO, UN-Habitat, UN-Water Technical Advisory Unit (TAU), UNDP, UNECE, UNEP, UNESCO, UNICEF, UNU, WHO, WMO and World Bank.

Capacity Development

WWAP strengthens the policy-science interface and supports decision-making on water through targeted capacity reinforcement and  knowledge sharing initiatives.

The capacity building activities are tailored around 3 key themes:

UN World Water Development Report
• Water and Sustainable Development: The training facilitates peer to peer exchange, development of country case studies and follow-up at country level. The workshop provides policy makers with tools for assessing water data, managing water resources and competing users, dealing with extreme events and with the challenge of growing urban environments.

• Wastewater The Untapped Resource: The training equips participants with the understanding of innovative approaches through concrete examples of successful applications of water use efficiency, water reuse, and bridging the policy-science interface.

Achieving the 2030 Agenda: Inspired by the UN-Water SDG 6 Synthesis Report 2018 on Water and Sanitation, this training program aims at supporting the Member States in the realization of the 2030 Agenda, with a particular focus on the implementation of the targets of SDG 6 “ensure availability and sustainable management of water and sanitation for all”, and the interlinkages with other SDGs.

Water and Gender: 
• Trainings at country level on sex-disaggregated water data collection and gender analysis. 
• Trainings on integrating gender equality, woman empowerment & social inclusion in IWRM initiatives & water policies.

Water and Gender
 
In 2014 WWAP has started a ground-breaking project on gender-sensitive water assessment, monitoring and reporting, with a goal to demonstrate how water is a gendered issue. Although women play a key role in the provision, management and safeguarding on water, gender inequality persist on the globe. The Advisor Group on Gender Equality founded in 2010, developed a series of indicators for the collection of sex-disaggregated water data, which are contained/included in the “Toolkits”, with the aim of addressing the considerable data gap on gender and water issues at the global level. The project developed a methodology using the indicators with the aim of advocating for the implementation of gender-sensitive water monitoring in the post-2015 agenda and, in particular, in the monitoring framework of the SDGs.

Reports
 Leaving No One Behind (WWDR 2019)
 Nature-based solutions for water  (WWDR 2018)
 Wastewater: the Untapped Resource  (WWDR 2017)
 Water and Jobs  (WWDR 2016)
 Water for a Sustainable World  (WWDR 2015)
 Water and Energy  (WWDR 2014)
 Managing Water under Uncertainty and Risk 
 Water in a Changing World
 Water: A Shared Responsibility 
 Water for People, Water for Life

References
	
World Water Assessment Programme

UNESCO

UN-Water

UN World Water Development Report 

International water associations
Water organizations
UNESCO